The mixed doubles badminton event at the 2015 Pan American Games will be held from July 11- 16 at the Atos Markham Pan Am Centre in Toronto. The defending Pan American Games champion is Toby Ng are Grace Gao of Canada.

The athletes will be drawn into an elimination stage draw. Once a team lost a match, it will be not longer able to compete. Each match will be contested as the best of three games.

Schedule
All times are Central Standard Time (UTC-6).

Seeds

 ' (champions)  (final)  (semifinals)  (second round)''

Results

Finals

Top Half

Bottom Half

References

Mixed doubles draw with results

Mixed doubles
Panamerican